Joongdong High School (Hangul: 중동고등학교, Hanja: 中東高等學校) is a private school founded in 1906, located in Irwon-dong, Gangnam District, Seoul, South Korea. The school and its foundation were undertaken in 1994 by Samsung Group by the will of group's founder, Lee Byung-chul, the school's 26th graduate. This school is currently operated by Joongdong Educational Foundation.

Reputation 
Many of Joongdong High School students get an offer from top-tier Korean universities. In 2011, Joongdong High School ranked #1 in the number of graduates to be offered a place at Seoul National University (considered the best university in South Korea). In 2012, the entrance rate for SKY universities was 21.6%, the highest in the country.

Notable alumni

Cha Kyung-bok, football manager
Cho Jae-min, footballer
Kim Chi-ha, poet & playwright
Kim Moo-sung, politician & former member of the National Assembly
Kim Soo-hyun, actor
Ko Jae-wook, footballer & football manager
Lee Byung-chul, founder of Samsung Group
Lee Byung-hun, actor
Lee Ho, footballer
Lee Kyu-hyung, actor
Moon Kook-hyun, politician
Song Wol-joo, Buddhist leader
Yang Joo-dong, poet & Korean language scholar
Yang Seung-jo, lawyer & governor of South Chungcheong Province

See also
Education in South Korea

References

External links
 

High schools in Seoul
Educational institutions established in 1906
1906 establishments in Korea
Boys' schools in South Korea